The 2007–08 South Alabama Jaguars basketball team represented the University of South Alabama during the 2007–08 NCAA Division I men's basketball season. The Jaguars were led by head coach Ronnie Arrow, in the first year of his second stint as head coach. They played their home games at the Mitchell Center, and were members of the Sun Belt Conference. They finished the season 26–7, 16–2 in Sun Belt play to finish tied for first place. They lost in the semifinals of the Sun Belt tournament, but received an at-large bid to the 2008 NCAA tournament as the 10 seed in the East region. In the opening round, the Jaguars lost to Butler.

Roster

Schedule and results

|-
!colspan=9 style=| Non-conference regular season

|-
!colspan=9 style=| Sun Belt Regular Season

|-
!colspan=9 style=| Sun Belt Conference tournament

|-
!colspan=9 style=| NCAA tournament

References

South Alabama Jaguars men's basketball seasons
South Alabama
South Alabama
2007 in sports in Alabama
2008 in sports in Alabama